The 2003 season was the Kansas City Chiefs' 34th in the National Football League (NFL), their 44th overall and their third under head coach Dick Vermeil.

The season resulted in a 13–3 winning record, beginning with a nine-game winning streak—the franchise's best start in their 40-year history. The Chiefs won the AFC West and clinched the second seed in the playoffs to end a five-season playoff drought. Kansas City lost in an offensive shootout at home in the AFC Divisional Playoffs to the Indianapolis Colts 38–31, a game noted for involving no punts from either team's kicking squad.

The season is best remembered for the Chiefs' record-breaking offense.  On December 28, running back Priest Holmes broke Marshall Faulk's single-season touchdown record, along with Emmitt Smith's single-season rushing touchdown record, by scoring his 27th rushing touchdown against the Chicago Bears.  Quarterback Trent Green threw for 4,000 yards and kick returner Dante Hall returned four kicks for touchdowns. However, the Chiefs' defense would prove to be too big a weakness, as they failed to stop the Colts in the 2003-04 playoffs. The Chiefs offensive line from the season has frequently been considered one of the best offensive lines in NFL history. Two members of the offensive line, Will Shields and Willie Roaf, have been inducted in the Pro Football Hall of Fame along with the tight end from the team, Tony Gonzalez.

NFL Draft

The Chiefs originally had the 16th pick in the 2003 NFL Draft. Vermeil was intent on selecting a defensive player, but felt that there were no defensive players available with their pick, and traded the pick to the Pittsburgh Steelers for the 27th pick, as well as the Steelers third and sixth-round picks.  With the 27th overall pick in the 2003 NFL Draft, the Kansas City Chiefs selected running back Larry Johnson from Penn State.

Staff

Roster

Preseason

Regular season
After beginning the 2003 season 9–0, the Chiefs finished the regular season with a record of 13–3.  The Chiefs' offense topped the NFL in almost all statistical categories and Kansas City became favorites to win Super Bowl XXXVIII.

The Chiefs clinched their first AFC West title since 1997 with a 45–17 win against the Detroit Lions, as QB Trent Green became the first player in team history to register a "perfect" 158.3 passer rating in a game.

Kansas City concluded its 13–3 regular season with a 31–3 victory vs. Chicago (December 28), marking a perfect 8–0 a record at home and the club's 13th consecutive regular-season victory at Arrowhead Stadium.  In that win, Priest Holmes set a trio of TD records. He finished the season with 27 rushing scores, establishing NFL single-season records for both rushing TDs and total TDs.  Holmes (61) also bypassed WR Otis Taylor (60) for the most career TDs scored by a player in Chiefs history.

The Chief's five-win improvement from the previous season tied as the best mark in franchise history. Kansas City became the first AFC team to lead the NFL in scoring in consecutive seasons since San Diego in 1981–1982 as the club produced a franchise-best 484 points.  The team also led the NFL with a +19 turnover differential.

Nine Chiefs players received Pro Bowl recognition, the third-highest total in team history, while the club's six offensive Pro Bowlers marked the most in club annals.

Schedule

Note: Intra-division opponents are in bold text.

Game summaries

Week 1 vs. San Diego Chargers 

The Chiefs hosted San Diego and raced to a 24-0 lead behind two Priest Holmes rushing scores and a Trent Green touchdown to Johnnie Morton.  Drew Brees  of the Chargers was intercepted twice in the 27-14 Chiefs win.

Week 2 vs. Pittsburgh Steelers 

The Steelers scored first on a Chad Scott interception, but after leading 10-0 Pittsburgh was torched by Dante Hall’s 100-yard kick return score.  Priest Holmes ran in three touchdowns while Steelers quarterback Tommy Maddox was intercepted three times including one returned for a touchdown by Jerome Woods in a 41-20 Chiefs win. During halftime the chiefs held a ceremony honoring former head coach Hank Stram inducting him into the ring of honor at Arrowhead Stadium.

Week 3 at Houston Texans 

The Chiefs made their first trip to Houston since September 1996, now playing in Reliant Stadium next door to the Astrodome. Kansas City's aggregate winning streak against Houston NFL teams reached five as Houston was hammered 42-14 despite two Trent Green interceptions.  The Chiefs rushed for 168 yards and three touchdowns.

Week 4 at Baltimore Ravens 

The Ravens held the Chiefs to 265 yards of offense and out-rushed them 202 yards (Jamal Lewis accounted for 115 yards and the tying touchdown in the final six minutes) to 129, but Dante Hall raced in the winning score (17-10 Chiefs) on the kickoff following Lewis’ score and Kyle Boller was intercepted at the Chiefs 2-yard line in the final minute.  Ex-Raven Priest Holmes had 25 touches (22 carries and four catches) for a combined 103 yards.

Week 5 vs. Denver Broncos 

Dante Hall’s signature touchdown came in the fourth quarter with the 4-0 Chiefs trailing 23-17 against the 4-0 Broncos.   In the final nine minutes, he caught a punt, was chased back to his three-yard line, then cut left, and stormed past the Denver punt coverage unit to score.   Jason Elam missed a Broncos field goal attempt but Priest Holmes fumbled at the Broncos eight-yard line.  Jake Plummer advanced the Broncos to their 28 but went no further.   

The Chief's 24-23 win came despite being outgained in yardage 468-262 and despite two turnovers to one by Denver.

Week 6 at Green Bay Packers 

This edition of the rematch series from the first AFL-NFL World Championship Game became one of the most competitive games of the season.  The Packers raced to a 14-0 lead before two Trent Green touchdowns tied the game.  The Packers scored seventeen straight points in the second and third quarters but early in the fourth Priest Holmes scored. Brett Favre was then intercepted by Jerome Woods at the Chiefs 21 and Woods scored.  Exchanges of field goals (Morten Anderson’s 31-yard kick came with one second left) left the game tied 31-31.  The Chiefs in overtime called eight straight Holmes rushes before trying a 48-yard field goal; the kick was blocked by Cletidus Hunt.  On the Packers possession Ahman Green was immediately stopped by Woods and Woods forced the fumble recovered at the Chiefs 49; Trent Green then unloaded deep to Eddie Kennison and Kennison scored, thus ending a 40-34 Chiefs triumph.

Week 7 at Oakland Raiders

Week 8 vs. Buffalo Bills 

Despite 124 rushing yards from Travis Henry and getting a safety on a Kansas City punt, the Bills were humiliated 38-5. Drew Bledsoe was intercepted three times and Alex Van Pelt two more while Trent Green had two touchdowns and 273 yards.

Week 10 vs. Cleveland Browns 

Trent Green had 368 yards and three touchdowns, Priest Holmes added two scores on the ground, and the Browns were limited to 199 yards of offense in a 41-20 Chiefs win. During halftime the chiefs in a ceremony honored their former running back Marcus Allen inducting him into the ring of honor.

Week 11 at Cincinnati Bengals 

An undefeated season (attending Miami's overtime win over the Ravens members of the 1972 Dolphins kept a close watch on this game) would not transpire as the Bengals surged to their fifth win, fulfilling a pregame prediction by Chad Johnson (seven catches, 74 yards) of a Bengals win. Jon Kitna’s 77-yard strike to Peter Warrick effectively ended the 24-19 Bengals upset despite a late Trent Green score.

Week 12 vs. Oakland Raiders 

The 3-7 Raiders refused to go quietly as they erased a 21-7 Chiefs lead. Jerry Rice scored for the first time all season but the Chiefs broke a 24-24 tie on Morten Anderson’s field goal with four seconds left.

Week 13 at San Diego Chargers 

The Chiefs reached eleven wins leading wire to wire at Qualcomm Stadium despite two Trent Green interceptions to go with two Green touchdowns. Priest Holmes exploded to 162 rushing yards and two scores.

Week 14 at Denver Broncos 

The Chiefs suffered their second loss of the season 45-27.  The game lead tied or changed six times in the first three quarters but after taking a 24-21 lead the Broncos added 21 more points.  Clinton Portis ran in five touchdowns for Denver.

Week 15 vs. Detroit Lions 

The 4-9 Lions were crushed 45-17 as Trent Green threw for 341 yards and three touchdowns while Priest Holmes added three scores of his own. It was Steve Mariucci’s only career loss to the Chiefs. This is Detroit's most recent visit to Kansas City; the Lions return there in 2023.

Week 16 at Minnesota Vikings 

Having clinched the AFC West the Chiefs were vying for a playoff bye.  The top conference seed slipped away in this Saturday game as the Vikings forced four Chiefs turnovers, raced to a 31-0 lead, and didn't look back despite a three-touchdown barrage by 10:05 to go in the fourth.  Despite the 45-20 loss, the Chiefs gained on a playoff bye on Denver's win over the Colts the next day.

Week 17 vs. Chicago Bears 

With New England's shutout win over the Bills the previous day the Chiefs could only secure a playoff bye as the second conference seed.  They did so 31-3 on three rushing scores while the 7-9 Bears used three quarterbacks who combined for two interceptions.

Standings

Postseason

Schedule

Game summaries

This offensive shootout became the second game without a punt in NFL playoff history, and first since the Buffalo Bills played the San Francisco 49ers in 1992.  Colts quarterback Peyton Manning threw for 304 yards and three touchdowns, while Edgerrin James ran for a career postseason high 125 yards and two scores. On the Kansas City side, Dante Hall caught a touchdown and returned a kickoff for another; and Priest Holmes, who set the regular-season rushing touchdown record, rushed for 176 yards, caught 5 passes for 32 yards, and scored twice.  Kansas City quarterback Trent Green threw for 212 yards and a touchdown while also rushing for 18 yards in his first career postseason game. The Chiefs defense failed to stop the Colt's offense. Kansas City's defensive coordinator Greg Robinson was asked to resign the following week.

References

See also
2003 Kansas City Chiefs on Database Football
http://sports.espn.go.com/nfl/teams/transactions?team=kan&year=2003

 Kansas City Chiefs seasons
Kansas City Chiefs
 AFC West championship seasons
Kansas